Eden Games SA (formerly known as Eden Studios) is a French video game developer based in Lyon, France, that mainly focuses on the development of racing video games.

History
The company was formed as a development group within Infogrames' European subsidiary Infogrames Multimedia, which had developed the first V-Rally for the PlayStation. The studio would later rebrand into its own separate studio, known as Eden Studios, with Infogrames holding a 19.2% minority share.

In April 2002, Infogrames fully acquired Eden Studios. During this period, the company would continue develop racing games such as Test Drive Unlimited and its sequel, Test Drive Unlimited 2, while also venturing into other game genres with games like Kya: Dark Lineage.

Atari announced that throughout April 2011, they had laid off over 51 of the 80 employees working at the studio, leading to a majority of the employees going on strike. In April 2012, Eden began negotiations as an attempt to separate from Atari. On January 29, 2013, the studio filed for judicial liquidation.

On October 31, 2013, under the impulsion of former employees and with the financing of ID Invest and Monster Capital, Eden Games reopened as an independent game development studio without any involvement of Atari. The company then released its first game, GT Spirit, on Apple TV in December 2015. The game was later followed up with Gear.Club and two Nintendo Switch versions - Gear.Club Unlimited and Gear.Club Unlimited 2.

From 2017 to 2021, the company was a subsidiary of Engine Media.

In April 2022, Eden Games were acquired by the Hong Kong-based blockchain gaming company, Animoca Brands. According to Animoca, the Eden team will be integrated into their business and work on blockchain-based racing games and contribute to Animoca's existing titles build around its REVV crypto token.

Games developed

References

External links
 
 Eden Games at MobyGames

Companies based in Lyon
French companies established in 1998
Video game companies established in 1998
Video game companies of France
Video game development companies
Re-established companies